The 2004 Categoría Primera A season was the 57th season of Colombia's top-flight football league. It began on 1 February and ended on 19 December 2004. 

Independiente Medellín won the Campeonato Apertura, and Atlético Junior won the Campeonato Finalizacion.

Campeonato Apertura 
The Campeonato Apertura (officially the 2004 Copa Mustang I for sponsorship reasons) was the first tournament of the season. It began on 1 February and ended on 16 May.

First stage

Standings 

 Pts=Points; GP=Games played; W=Wins; D=Draws; L=Losses; GF=Goals Favored; GA=Goals Allowed; GD=Goal Difference

Semifinals 

The second phase of the 2004-I tournament consisted of two groups, each containing 4 teams. This was disputed by the best eight teams from the first phase of the tournament. The winners of each group face in the finals to define a champion.

Group A

Group B

Finals

Campeonato Finalización 
The Campeonato Finalización (officially the 2004 Copa Mustang II for sponsorship reasons) was the second tournament of the season. It began on 1 August and ended on 19 December.

First phase

Standings 

 Pts=Points; GP=Games played; W=Wins; D=Draws; L=Losses; GF=Goals Favored; GA=Goals Allowed; GD=Goal Difference

Semifinals 

Just like in the Apertura, the second phase of the 2004-II tournament consisted of two groups, each containing 4 teams. This was disputed by the best eight teams from the first phase of the tournament. The winners of each group face in the finals to define a champion.

Group A

Group B

Finals

Relegated and promoted team(s)

External links 
 Copa Mustang Official Page
 Dimayor Official Page
 website

2004
2004 in Colombian football
Col